The Joan & Joseph Birman Research Prize in Topology and Geometry was established in 2013 and is a prize given every other year by the Association for Women in Mathematics to an outstanding young female researcher in topology or geometry. The prize fund for the award was established by a donation from Joan Birman and her husband, Joseph Birman.

The winners have included:
 Elisenda Grigsby (2015), for her research in low-dimensional topology, particularly in knot theory and categorified invariants.
 Emmy Murphy (2017), for her research in symplectic geometry where she developed new techniques for studying symplectic manifolds and contact geometry.
 Kathryn Mann (2019), for "major breakthroughs in the theory of dynamics of group actions on manifolds".
 Emily Riehl (2021), for "deep and foundational work in category theory and homotopy theory."

See also

 List of awards honoring women
 List of mathematics awards

References

External links
AWM Birman Research Prize, Association for Women in Mathematics

Awards honoring women
Awards and prizes of the Association for Women in Mathematics